Wallace is the remains of a lunar impact crater that has been flooded by lava. It was named after British natural historian Alfred Russel Wallace. It lies in the southeastern part of Mare Imbrium, to the northeast of the crater Eratosthenes. The crater rim forms a somewhat polygonal outline, and is broken in the southeast. The floor is flat and devoid of significant features, but it is overlain by ray material from Copernicus to the southwest. The rim ascends to an altitude of 0.4 km above the lunar mare.

Satellite craters
By convention these features are identified on Lunar maps by placing the letter on the side of the crater midpoint that is closest to Wallace.

The following craters have been renamed by the IAU.
 Wallace B — See Huxley (lunar crater).

View

References

External links

Wallace at The Moon Wiki
 
 

Impact craters on the Moon
Mare Imbrium